Still Da Baddest is the fourth studio album by American rapper Trina. It was released on April 1, 2008, by Slip-n-Slide, EMI and DP Entertainment. The album was preceded by the lead single, "Single Again" on November 6, 2007. Following the poor chart performance, "I Got a Thang for You" featuring Keyshia Cole, was released as the album's second single. The album's third and final single "Look Back at Me" featuring Killer Mike, which was produced by Hard Hat Productions, became a regional hit club record and accompanied by a music video.

The album garnered positive reviews from critics, most of whom praised the vigorous sexual-lyrics most have become accustomed to from Trina. However multiple critics showed disregard for some of the album's mid-tempo tracks as attempts to recapture the success of "Here We Go". The album debuted at number 6 on the Billboard 200 and number one on the US R&B/Hip-Hop Albums.

Background

In 2007, the recording session on Trina's fourth studio album took place. In an interview with Billboard, Slip-N-Slide Records President Ted Lucas stated, "The songs selected for the album were tracks ladies needed to hear-about maturing and keeping focus [...] Her fans know she's rough and they like that. So she's back with a little of that, but she's matured as well. That's why she's still the baddest." In an interview with Rajul Punjabi, Trina described the album's direction as experimental, noting her vocal additions to "Single Again" and the techno-production on "Crash My Party" as prime examples. Trina revealed that the energy surrounding the album is different because it marks her first release since parting ways with longtime boyfriend, American rapper Lil Wayne, forcing her view through a different perspective. Although she viewed the relationship as a "beautiful experience" that brought light to a new side of her personality, she stated:

I just think it’s because of the place I’m in. I’m happy. I feel good about going into the studio on this project after the change from Atlantic [Records] and with all the issues from the label’s side. When it came down to the actual production and putting the album together, I was in a more peaceful place. Just the production from everyone from Scott Storch to Cool & Dre—the producers I’ve been working with have been bringing it out of me.

Following the album's lead single, speculations arose on the album's title which was originally thought to be titled Da Baddest Bitch II. For unknown reasons the album's title was changed to the current Still da Baddest. Originally set to be released on February 12, 2008, the album release was pushed back to April 1, 2008.

Music and lyrics

Still da Baddest is built much like a late-1990s Bad Boy album, the perfect mode for a rapper like Trina. Guest appearances are frequent but appropriate and the tracks vary enough stylistically to stay away from being repetitive. Trina's lyrics aren't mind blowing but they focuses on her strengths ("Look Back at Me" is more graphic than most actual pornography) and down-plays her weaknesses; her voice has improved noticeably as well. "I Got a Bottle" is built on a fairly obvious jack of "SexyBack" and "Single Again" makes no effort to pretend that isn't trying to replicate the Timbaland sound. Other songs are less specific bites, but most fill obligatory roles that Hip Hop and R&B listeners will be well accustomed to, from the "love song" ("I Wish I Never Met You") to the "strip club song" ("Stop Traffic").

"Single Again" matches a rapid-fire tempo with something you wouldn't necessarily expect from the baddest woman in rap—singing on the hook and in the second verse. The topic matter is equal parts about being in love and making love, leaving little doubt that Trina is a modern day diva who feels empowered by her sexuality. That's not to say Trina doesn't have a softer side, as she hooks up with R&B soulstress Keyshia Cole on "I Got A Thang For You" to profess her unrequited love for a fly guy: "See I'm Brad Pitt, I'm Jolie, when we together we all we see.../ I got a thang for you, so how you feel about me?" Guests play a small but significant role in Trina's presentation. Missy Elliott joins Trina on the underrated track "I Got a Bottle" produced by Jay Roc & Big Tom (Hard Hat Productions) to pay homage to their feminine curves. Fellow Floridian Pitbull drops by to confess that Trina is so fly that she can "Stop Traffic" by walking down the street. Even the husky-voiced Rick Ross gets into the action as Gorilla Tek provides a nostalgic beat for "Hot Commodity," which has Trina in the mood to reference "La-Di-Da-Di" in the chorus.

Promotion 
Preceding the album's release, Slip-N-Slide Records ran ads on Internet dating sites and sponsored blind-date contests on radio stations across the country, in reference to the album lead single, "Single Again." Trina also launched a radio and retail promo tour beginning January 10, 2008.

Singles
To precede the album's release, lead single "Single Again" was released on American iTunes Stores November 6, 2007. The song, which was originally set to feature Christina Milian features Trina singing the songs hook and second verse. The song was accompanied by a music video released on February 10, 2008. "Single Again" peaked on Billboard'''s Hot Rap Tracks and Hot R&B/Hip-Hop Singles & Tracks at number nineteen and fifty-nine, respectively. "I Got a Thang For You", featuring R&B singer Keyshia Cole, was released as the album's second single. The song was also accompanied by a music video. It was successful on the Hot R&B/Hip-Hop Singles & Tracks Billboard Chart, charting at number #59. "Look Back At Me", featuring Killer Mike, was released as the album's third and final single, with an accompanying music video. Over sea's in Denmark,the song will become Trina's first number one single.

 Commercial performance Still da Baddest debuted at number six on the US Billboard 200 on the week ending April 19, 2008, with 47,000 copies sold in its first week. The entry marks her first top 10 set. Still da Baddest debuted on the top spot of Billboard's R&B/Hip-Hop Albums and Rap Albums at number one on the week ending April 19, 2008. To date the album sold over 480,000 copies.

Reception

 Critical reception Still da Baddest garnered generally positive reviews from critics, most of whom favored Trina's signature raunchy rap styling over a softer-side. Awarding the album three-and-a-half stars, David Jeffries of AllMusic praised the album for capturing the raw edge found on the rappers debut album with a modern twist, but had mixed emotions on the album's ability to duplicate the success found in "Here We Go" (2005). Jeffries continued his review by noting "I Got a Thing for You" and "Wish I Never Met You" as the album's main flaws, referencing them as "manufactured 'Here We Go' clones" dragging down what would otherwise be an entirely successful full-length. Jeffries ends his review by stating "It's the abundance of these brassy, 'love me or hate me' moments that make Still Da Baddest a step in the right direction and one of her better efforts, even with the woefully uninspired ballads." Praising Trina's appealing curves, frank attitude and seductive songs, Jason Seifer of Walmart praised Trina's raunchy style stating "Any concerns Trina had about being reduced in rank or status are quickly squashed within the span of a dozen tracks, leaving Katrina Taylor the freedom to get a little more personal with her audience." Seifer went on to compliment Trina's softer side on the Keyshia Cole-assisted "I Got A Thang For You," later showing great appreciation on the album's tracks that featured additional rappers and vocalists. Praising Trina as one of the few female rappers around at the time, Alex Thornton of HipHopDX noted that although Still da Baddest isn't a huge leap for Trina in terms of subject matter, more effort has been obviously put into this album than any of her past releases. Thornton went on to negatively state that the album is ultimately forgettable since much of her work borrows from recent Pop and Hip Hop successes by other artists, even though it was never intended to be an artsy, avant-garde offering for hipsters so the formulaic approach isn't as much of a problem as it might seem. Aisha Johnson of AllHipHop noted that the album lacks any true substance and fails to go beyond her sexually aggressive commentary. Praising Trinas fiery southern flow alongside guest appearances from Missy, Keyshia Cole, and Rick Ross to help bring forth some creative synergy, Johnson felt the LP doesn't compare to the rappers debut Da Baddest B***h. Awarding Trina with the title of "Queen Victoria of Rap," Evelyn McDonnell of VIBE praised the album for proving Trina to not be a "one trick pony," favoring standout tracks like "Clear It Out," "Single Again, "Look Back At Me," and "Wish I Never Met You."

Khia controversy
Following the album's release, rapper Khia revealed that she bought the album at a neighboring Target only to negatively review the album through her official MySpace. The feud between the rappers had undergone silence prior to the album's release, however following the album release Khia released multiple blogs referencing the album's shortcomings and taking jabs at a 2006 miscarriage that Trina and then-boyfriend Lil Wayne had undergone. She wrote "U STILL THE HOE U ALWAYS BEEN. AND HOES DONT GET NO RESPECT!!!!!! PUPPETTTTTT!!!![sic]."

Although she never rebutted to Khia's remarks, Trina was asked in an interview by Rajul Punjabi about the lack of female MC's in the industry at the moment, stating:

I think I’d go hard either way. Competition is always great. I think everything you do, it’s always competitive no matter what field you’re in. There’s always going to be somebody that’s going to be competing in your field. There aren’t that many female artists, but the ones that are in the business, I love and respect them. From Lil’ Kim to Missy to Eve to Shawnna, everyone is doing their own thing. I think we all have similarities but we all are different in our own ways. And because there’s such a lack of females in the game, for me it’s like, you gotta smash hard, you gotta [make] an impact, and you gotta do you. We need that unity from the females and we need to join forces and make records together.

Trina released the iTunes version of the album with the bonus track "You Ain't Nothing" as an apparent diss-track towards Khia.

 Track listing 
The album track listing was revealed through pre-order on Amazon.com.

Personnel
Credits for Still da Baddest'' adapted from Allmusic.

Performance
Katrina "Trina" Taylor – primary artist, vocals, writer, executive producer
Keyshia Cole - primary artist
Killer Mike - primary artist
Missy Elliott - primary artist
Pitbull - primary artist
Qwote - primary artist
Rick Ross - primary artist
Shonie - primary artist

Technical

Musa "Milk" Adeoye - A&R
Josh "Redd" Burke - A&R, Executive Producer
Dru Castro - Engineer
Krishna Das - Mixing
Seth Firkins - Mixing
Matthew Zeek Harris - Engineer
Eldwardo "Eddie Mix" Hernandez - Engineer
Jim Jonsin - Producer
Jay Roc 'Hard Hat Productions" - Producer
Big Tom aka Chevy Boy "Hard Hat Productions" - Producer
Jonathan Mannion - Photography
A. Martin - Composer
Steve Obas - Engineer, Producer
A.C. Perez - Composer
Karen "KD" Douglas - Creative Direction
Lili Picou - Art Direction, Design
James Scheffer - Composer
Ray Seay - Mixing
Max Unruh - Mixing Assistant
Reginald Saunders- 2ThePointMusic 
Nadine Vendryes - Make-Up

Chart position

Year-end charts

References

External links
  Trina's New Website

2008 albums
Albums produced by Jim Jonsin
Albums produced by Kane Beatz
Trina albums
EMI Records albums